Thambiah Ahambaram (also spelled Ehambaram) (12 October 1913 – 22 March 1961) was a Ceylon Tamil politician and Member of Parliament.

Ahambaram was born on 12 October 1913.

Ahambaram stood as the Illankai Tamil Arasu Kachchi's (Federal Party) candidate for Mutur at the March 1960 parliamentary election. He won the election and entered Parliament as the first member for Mutur. He was re-elected at the July 1960 parliamentary election as the first member for Mutur. Ahambaram died in office.

References

1913 births
1961 deaths
Illankai Tamil Arasu Kachchi politicians
Members of the 4th Parliament of Ceylon
Members of the 5th Parliament of Ceylon
People from Eastern Province, Sri Lanka
People from British Ceylon
Sri Lankan Tamil politicians